The California Legislative LGBTQ Caucus (formerly the California Legislative LGBT Caucus) is an American political organization formed in June 2002 and composed of openly lesbian, gay, bisexual and transgender members of the California State Legislature. The caucus currently has 12 members, a record.

This group is contrasted to other LGBT Equality Caucuses in that the California caucus consists entirely of LGBT legislators while other LGBT Equality Caucuses consist of all orientations. Both, however, promote the promulgation of LGBT-affirming laws within the legislature.

Role
The caucus was established to champion legislation that advances equality and the rights of LGBT Californians. Its members have introduced and passed numerous measures related to gay rights, including two same-sex marriage bills (both vetoed by the governor), bills prohibiting discrimination in state government, tackling orientation-based bullying in schools and adequately funding HIV/AIDS treatment. In December 2008, in the wake of the passage of Proposition 8, members of the LGBTQ Caucus pushed a resolution expressing the legislature's opinion that the proposition was unconstitutional.

In addition, the caucus sponsors an annual LGBT Pride Exhibit every June and presents the LGBT Pride Recognition Awards to outstanding Californians. In 2006, several Republican legislators boycotted the awards ceremony, walking off the Assembly floor as the awards were presented. This boycott stalled the ceremony for several years until 2009 when it was resurrected.  In each year since, many Republicans have boycotted the ceremony.

Feature in a documentary
A 2016 documentary film, Political Animals, by Jonah Markowitz features the accomplishments of California legislators Carole Migden, Sheila Kuehl, Jackie Goldberg, and Christine Kehoe.

Members
23 openly LGBT people have served in the legislature and been members of the caucus – all gay or lesbian and Democrats. 12 of them are current office holders.

In addition, there has been one gay member of the legislature who, despite being open about his sexual orientation, was not a member of the caucus. Republican state senator Roy Ashburn from Kern County came out in March 2010 after having been arrested while driving under the influence on his way home from a gay bar. He served the remaining eight months of his term but did not join the caucus.

There have also been members of the legislature who, though not open about their sexuality at the time they served in public office, subsequently declared themselves gay or lesbian. Dennis Mangers, who represented Orange County in the Assembly from 1976 to 1980, married his partner of 17 years, Michael Sestak, in June 2008. Art Torres, who served 8 years in the Assembly and 12 in the State Senate before going on to spend 13 years as chair of the California Democratic Party, came out publicly in April 2009.

Current members

Former members

Chronology of openly LGBT legislators
The table below shows members of the legislature who were openly LGBT at the time they served. It extends back to the election of the first openly gay member of the California legislature: Sheila Kuehl (elected November 1994). The caucus was founded in 2002.

Chairs

References

External links
 California Legislative LGBTQ Caucus

California State Legislature

Organizations established in 2002
LGBT caucuses
2002 establishments in California